Cape Musselman is a cape forming the south side of the entrance to Palmer Inlet, on the east coast of Palmer Land. Discovered by members of the United States Antarctic Service (USAS) who explored this coast by land and from the air from East Base in 1940. Named for Lytton C. Musselman, member of the East Base party which sledged across Dyer Plateau to the vicinity of Mount Jackson, which stands inland from this cape.

Headlands of Palmer Land